The 2015–16 FC Dinamo București season is the 67th consecutive edition of competitive football by FC Dinamo București's in Liga I. Dinamo also competed in Cupa României and Cupa Ligii. Dinamo continued its insolvency status and was unable to buy any players, attracting only free agents and players on loan. In September, the Court announced that Dinamo fulfilled its bankruptcy obligations to exit insolvency.

On 22 November, Dinamo defeated its chief rival, Steaua, 3–1, following a gap from the last win four and a half years earlier.

Players

Squad changes

Transfers in:

Transfers out:

Loans out

Squad statistics

Disciplinary record
Includes all competitive matches.

Competitions

Liga I

Regular season

Table

Results by round

Championship round

Table

Results by round

Competitive

Liga I
Kickoff times are in EET.

Cupa României

Cupa Ligii

Non competitive matches

References

External links
soccerway
Liga1.ro
romaniansoccer.ro

2015-16
Dinamo București